William Padwick, sometimes known as William Padwick the younger, was a significant figure in the development of Hayling Island in the mid-nineteenth century.

By 1812 he had established himself as a lawyer.

In 1814 he married Grace Taylor, the daughter of William Taylor, who was an admiral in the Royal Navy.

Moving to Warblington House, he drove the enterprise to create first Langstone Bridge, a toll bridge that opened in 1824.

In 1825 he bought South Hayling Manor from Bernard Howard, 12th Duke of Norfolk.  This also included Manor Farm, Sinah Farm and South Common.  As Lord of the manor this came with various royalties, tithes, ferry rights and mud rights, and was noted for enforcement particular in respect of the Oyster fisheries.

Famed for his desire to develop and promote Hayling Island as a tourist destination, his aspirations led to early development of West Town.  He engaged a London architect to develop 'Beachlands' with the 'Norfolk Hotel', a crescent, bath house and horse racing track.  The golf course on Sinah Common was another amenity he created.

He was also heavily involved in the failed attempt to run a railway over mud flats in Langstone Harbour, creating wet and dry docks at Sinah Lake.

William Padwick died in 1861.

References 

1791 births
1861 deaths
19th-century British lawyers